Anna Karin Larsson (later Ahlström, 30 August 1941 – 21 September 2019) was a Swedish swimmer who won a bronze medal at the 1958 European Aquatics Championships in the 4×100 m freestyle relay. She competed in the same event at the 1956 and 1960 Summer Olympics and finished sixth in both games. Individually, she was eliminated in the preliminaries of the 100 m and 400 m freestyle.

Larsson retired from active swimming in 1962 to focus on her studies; she graduated in physiotherapy from Lund University. However, she later returned to the pool and competed for a few years in the masters category. She also worked as a swimming coach and as instructor with disabled persons. She had three children: Peter Ahlström (b. 1965), Mats Ahlström (b. 1967) and Katarina Ahlström (b. 1970). Her mother died when Larsson was 19 years old. Her younger sister, Kristina, and brother, Gunnar are also former Olympic swimmers; Kristina competed with the same 4×100 m freestyle team at the 1960 Olympics.

References

1941 births
2019 deaths
Swimmers at the 1956 Summer Olympics
Swimmers at the 1960 Summer Olympics
Olympic swimmers of Sweden
Sportspeople from Malmö
European Aquatics Championships medalists in swimming
Universiade medalists in swimming
Universiade gold medalists for Sweden
Universiade silver medalists for Sweden